Avoid Freud is the second album by Canadian new wave band Rough Trade, released in 1980 (True North TN-43 in Canada, Stiff America USE 14 in the U.S., CBS 84952 in The Netherlands). It placed at least as high as #19 on the Canadian RPM Top Albums Chart on March 14, 1981. (Inferred from archive listing for following week.) The album was certified gold in Canada (50,000 units) by the CRIA on March 1, 1981, then advanced to platinum certification (100,000 units) by June of the same year.

The first single released from the album was the controversial "What's The Furor About The Führer?" b/w "Fashion Victim" (True North TN4-157), the latter track becoming the larger hit, reaching #25 in Canada on the National Top 50 Singles Chart on February 7, 1981 and #3 on the RPM CANCON Chart the following week. The album's most famous single, however, is "High School Confidential" (b/w "Grade B Movie", True North TN4-159), which was intensely controversial for its explicitly sexual lyrics, which include references to lesbianism. The influential Toronto radio station CHUM-FM paid for the band to record a cleaned-up version that avoided the line, "She makes me cream my jeans when she comes my way." It reached #1 on the RPM CANCON Chart and #12 on the National Top 50 Chart on June 20 of the same year.

Track listing

Personnel 

 Carole Pope - Songwriter, lead vocals
 Kevan Staples - Vocals, guitar, piano, synthesiser
 David McMorrow - Vocals, piano, Rhodes, synthesisers
 Terry Wilkins - Vocals, Fender fretless bass
 Bucky Berger - Vocals, drums
 Gene Martynec - Producer
 Gary Gray - Engineer
 David Taylor - Assistant engineer
 George Marino - Mastering
 Peter J. Moore - Remastering, restoration
 Vicki Wickham - Direction

References

External links
 Amazon.com review
 Artist Direct review
 buy.com review
 Rate Your Music review

1980 debut albums
Rough Trade (band) albums
Stiff Records albums
True North Records albums